A Venefica was a Roman sorceress who used drugs, potions, and poison for several reasons. Venefica means "a female who poisons" in Latin. The word appears in Roman authors such as Cicero and Horace. Ovid uses it of Medea the sorceress in his Metamorphoses. Later it appears in one of Sir Francis Bacon's Essays,"Of Friendship" in the following lines: "And it seemeth his favour was so great, as  Antonius, in a letter which is recited  verbatim in one of  Cicero’s  Philippics, calleth him ‘venefica,’  witch, —as if he had  enchanted Caesar."

Other definitions

Venefica under the above definition is found in the book Raptor by Gary Jennings, where a venefica slave is purchased in order to assist in carrying out revenge. The setting of this book is in the declining Roman Empire around 500 A.D. In this novel, veneficas are defined as "girl slaves who are, from their infancy, fed certain poisons, first in minute amounts, then in increasing doses throughout their upbringing. By the time they are grown to maidenhood, their own bodies are accustomed to these substances and are unharmed by them. However, so virulent is the accumulated poison, that a man who beds with a venefica - or anyone who partakes of any of her juices - dies on the instant."

External links
Witchvox article with section on Venefica (archived)
Meaning of the name Venefica
Raven Grimassi examines the term Venefica in witchcraft

Ancient Roman occupations
Witchcraft in Italy
Women in ancient Rome